Clifford Brown MBE (22 July 1916 – 16 December 1993) was a British television editor and director who became the second European Broadcasting Union (EBU) head of the Eurovision Song Contest serving as supervising director of the show from 1966 to 1977.

Brown was born in 1916 in Inverness, Scotland, after joining the army he started working for Scottish Television and ITV. In 1966, he was appointed to be director for the Eurovision Song Contest and moved to Geneva to work at the EBU.

Over his tenure the song contest grew from one hosted in hotel ballrooms to an event filling large concert halls. It also became too expensive for smaller countries to host and after winning both Monaco and Luxembourg declined hosting. His era also saw the introduction of the douze points voting system that has become the Eurovision standard.

While serving as head of Eurovision he appeared on the broadcasts as the adjudicator and scrutineer of the voting. In 1969 when the Contest was held in Spain there was a four-way tie between France, Spain, UK and the Netherlands. Before the show the presenter (Laura Valenzuela) had asked Brown what would happen if there was a tie, his reply was "Madam, that never happened before, and that's never going to happen", as noted in The Eurovision Song Contest — The Official History by author and historian John Kennedy O'Connor, Brown admitted in a BBC documentary in 1992 that the result caused disgust among many people, not least the Scandinavian countries.

Brown stepped down as scrutineer in 1977 and was awarded the MBE award in 1990. He died in December 1993 after a period of ill health.

References

1916 births
1993 deaths
People from Inverness
Scottish television directors
Eurovision Song Contest people
Members of the Order of the British Empire
British Army personnel of World War II